This is a list of Bengali language films that released in 2021.

January–March

April–June

July–September

October–December

References

External links
 Upcoming Bengali Films

Bengali
2021

Indian Bengali